Lines in My Face is the third commercially released album from Chronic Future. It features the hit single "Time and Time Again", and has a range of themes in the tracks involving the Golden Era of the radio, New York City, and friendships. The album put the band into the mainstream for a short period, before the band left Interscope Records in 2006 and began an independent career.

A music video for the song "Time and Time Again" was made, featuring animated characters including the band itself. The music video tells the story of a rebellious young boy (seeming to be Mike Busse, as he performs lead vocals when the band plays in the video) who is sent off to war by his parents, but returns as a war hero. It is currently one of two music videos the band has made, the other being the video for "Insomniac" from the band's self-titled debut album.

The album featured more metal-orientated guitar styles, as well as Brandon Lee taking on the role as one of the lead vocalists.

Reception
The album received average to positive ratings and the song "Time and Time Again" was praised, becoming an instant favorite. The song "Shellshocked" is also very popular among fans. The album peaked at #18 on the Billboard Heatseekers chart.

Rolling Stone (p. 188) - 3.5 stars out of 5 - "[M]ost songs navigate the well-worn territory of pop punk and rap rock without bowing to the conventions of either."

Media appearances
 "Time and Time Again" was used on the soundtrack of the hit video games Burnout 3 and MVP Baseball 2004, performed at G4's Gphoria in 2004, used for the 2004 WWE Diva Search, and was used in episode 20 of the first season of One Tree Hill.
 "Wicked Games" was featured on the CSI: Miami episode Crime Wave.
 "Static on the Radio" was used on the soundtrack of the video game Gretzky NHL 2005.
 "Apology for Non-Symmetry" was used on the soundtrack of the driving simulator Gran Turismo 4.

Track listing

Note: In digital music stores, "Say Goodbye" is renamed to "Say Goodbye/Final Ambience."

Personnel
Mike Busse – lead vocals, backing vocals
Ben Collins – lead vocals, lead guitar, turntables, programming, backing vocals
Mike Loy – rhythm guitar
Brandon Lee – lead vocals, bass guitar, backing vocals
Barry Collins – drums, percussion

References

2004 albums
Chronic Future albums